Mark Raymond Fischer (born July 29, 1974) is a former American football center who played in the National Football League for the Washington Redskins.  He played college football at Purdue University and was drafted in the fifth round of the 1998 NFL Draft. During the 2000 NFL season, Fischer became the starting center of the Washington Redskins starting in all 16 games. The following year, Cory Raymer regained his starting position. In week 4 of the 2001 season Fischer sustained a season ending ACL rupture. He signed with the Denver Broncos in 2002 but was released before the season started. As of 2013 he is a Managing Director at PNC Capital Markets LLC division of PNC Financial Services Group.

References

1974 births
Living people
Players of American football from Cincinnati
American football centers
Purdue Boilermakers football players
Washington Redskins players